Gecarcinus nobili is a species of land crab closely related to the halloween moon crab (G. quadratus). It was described in 2014. It is from the Neotropical Pacific coast of northwestern South America.

Range and habitat
G. nobilii is found along the South American Pacific coast, from Colombia to Peru. It inhabits the mangrove, tropical rainforest and other habitats that lines the coast.

Behavior
It behaves almost indistinguishably from its relative G. quadratus.

References

Grapsoidea
Crustaceans described in 2014